"Ooh It's Kinda Crazy" is a song by Canadian pop group soulDecision, originally released in 1998 as an independent single when the band was known as Indecision. It was re-released in August 2000 as the third single from their debut album No One Does It Better. Many AC and hot AC radio stations in Canada play the 1998 version rather than the album version. Even though some critics pointed to its striking similarity to George Michael's "Fastlove", the song was released in 2000 in the United States and a music video was shot, which was directed by Stephen Scott. The video became soulDecision's first number one on TRL.

Content
Trevor Guthrie is the writer of the song, and he sings about a love interest who evades him. The lyrics stem from a sour relationship lead singer Trevor Guthrie went through.

Chart performance
"Ooh Its Kinda Crazy"  reached number 45 on the Canadian RPM Singles Chart. when first released in 1998. The song gained significantly on the chart when re-released in 2000, reaching number 18. The song had similar success in the U.S, reaching number 26 on the Mainstream Top 40. The single however seemed a bit of a letdown abroad, not charting in the United Kingdom or Asia, or the Hot 100. "Ooh It's Kinda Crazy" went on to become a fan favorite. After this single, the band would never chart again in the United States. It peaked at number 49 in Australia in April 2001.

Music video

The video begins with Dave Bowman waking up listening to the group's single "Faded" and Bowman crushes the radio with a hammer and wakes up to a crowd of screaming girls. Throughout the video the members of soulDecision try their best to evade the adoring crowd through silly costumes as they attempt to get to soundcheck. The video was filmed in Toronto, including at Main & Gerrard St.  Eventually, the band makes it to their soundcheck which eventually turns into a concert. This video became a hit on both Total Request Live and MuchMusic, reaching number two.

Track listing
Canada promo single 
1 "Ooh It's Kinda Crazy" (22 Green radio mix) – 4:08
2 "Ooh It's Kinda Crazy" (22 Green club mix) – 9:39
3 "Ooh It's Kinda Crazy" (22 Green club mix – instrumental) – 9:39

Canada vinyl, 12", promo 
A1 "Ooh It's Kinda Crazy" (22 Green club mix) – 9:40
A2 "Ooh It's Kinda Crazy" (22 Green radio mix) – 4:08
B1 "Ooh It's Kinda Crazy" (22 Green club mix – instrumental) – 9:40
B2 "Ooh It's Kinda Crazy" (22 Green radio mix – instrumental) – 4:08

The 22 Green remixes were reproduced and mixed by Mark Ryan.

Charts

References

External links

1999 singles
SoulDecision songs
1998 songs
MCA Records singles
Songs written by Trevor Guthrie